Narayanaswamy Jayaraman (born 1964) is an Indian organic chemist and a professor and the chair of the department of organic chemistry at the Indian Institute of Science. He is known for his work on synthesis of complex carbohydrates and new dendrimers and is an elected fellow of the Indian Academy of Sciences. The Council of Scientific and Industrial Research, the apex agency of the Government of India for scientific research, awarded him the Shanti Swarup Bhatnagar Prize for Science and Technology, one of the highest Indian science awards, in 2009, for his contributions to chemical sciences.

Biography 

N. Jayaraman, Born on 25 May 1964 in the south Indian state of Tamil Nadu, did his master's studies in chemistry at Annamalai University and after the completion of the course in 1988, he enrolled for his doctoral studies under the guidance of S. Ranganathan to secure a PhD in 1994. His post-doctoral work was at University of Birmingham during 1994–97 and later at the laboratory of James Fraser Stoddart, the 2016 Nobel laureate in Chemistry, at the University of California, Los Angeles during 1997–99. Returning to India, he joined the premiere Indian Institute of Science where he serves as a professor and the chair of the department of organic chemistry

Legacy 
Jayaraman's researches are primarily focused on dendrimers and carbohydrates. He is known to have done extensive work on the synthesis of complex carbohydrates and developed new system of dendrimers. He has also worked on carbohydrate-protein interactions using designer glycolipids as well as on monosaccharides, cluster glycosides, oligosaccharides and unnatural sugars. He is also credited with the identification of poly(alkyl aryl ether) dendrimers and poly(propyl ether imine) dendrimers, two new classes of dendrimers. He has documented his researches in several peer-reviewed articles; ResearchGate an online repository of scientific articles has listed 149 of them. He has also mentored a number of scholars in their doctoral and post-doctoral studies.

Awards and honors 
Jayaraman received the Bronze Medal of the Chemical Research Society of India (CRSI) in 2007  and the Council of Scientific and Industrial Research awarded him the Shanti Swarup Bhatnagar Prize, one of the highest Indian science awards, in 2009. In between, he was selected for the Diamond Jubilee Fellowship of the Institute of Chemical Technology in 2008. He received the Goyal Prize in 2011, the same year as he was elected as a fellow by the Indian Academy of Sciences. He has delivered a number of award orations including the Professor Swaminathan Endowment Lecture of the University of Madras in 2007.

See also 
 Fraser Stoddart
 Dendrimer

References

External links

Further reading 
 

Recipients of the Shanti Swarup Bhatnagar Award in Chemical Science
1964 births
Indian scientific authors
Fellows of the Indian Academy of Sciences
Indian organic chemists
Living people
Annamalai University alumni
Scientists from Tamil Nadu
Tamil scientists
Alumni of the University of Birmingham
University of California, Los Angeles alumni
Academic staff of the Indian Institute of Science